John Ray Clemmons (born July 14, 1977) is an American politician from the state of Tennessee. A member of the Democratic Party, he serves in the Tennessee House of Representatives, representing the 55th district, in West Nashville.

Early life
Clemmons was born in Lebanon, Tennessee, raised on a farm between Lebanon and Watertown, Tennessee, and attended Lebanon High School, graduating with Honors in 1995. He then earned a Bachelor of Arts in history from Columbia University, while rowing on the Columbia lightweight crew team, in 1999. He earned a Juris Doctor from the University of Memphis Law School in 2006.

He and his wife Tamara Baxt Clemmons have three children, and the family lives in Nashville, Tennessee. Clemmons is a civil litigation attorney.

Political career

2014–2019 
In the 2014 elections, at 36 years of age Clemmons challenged Gary Odom, the incumbent representative for the 55th district in the Tennessee House of Representatives in the Democratic primary, who had held the seat since Clemmons was eight years old. Odom had served in the Tennessee General Assembly since 1986, and was a former House majority leader. Clemmons defeated Odom, with 54% of the vote. Clemmons was then unopposed in the general election.

In 2016, Clemmons ran for reelection to his House seat, and was unopposed in both the Democratic primary and general elections. In 2018, he ran again for his House seat, and was unopposed in the Democratic primary and won the general election with 100% of the vote.

Clemmons ran for Mayor of Nashville in the 2019 Nashville mayoral election. One of the younger candidates in the race, he focused on public education, affordable housing, and infrastructure. In the 10-candidate race he finished in fourth place behind incumbent Nashville Mayor David Briley, eventual winner John Cooper, and Vanderbilt University professor Carol M. Swain, failing to make the two-candidate runoff election.

2020–present
In 2020, Clemmons ran for reelection to his House seat, and was unopposed in both the Democratic primary and general elections. In 2021-2022 he was on the House Civil Justice Committee, Education Administration Committee, and Health Committee. In 2022 he was rated 92% by NORML (the National Organization for the Reform of Marijuana Laws).

In January 2022, when the board of trustees of McMinn County Schools in Tennessee, in a 10–0 decision, removed the Pulitzer Prize-winning Holocaust graphic novel Maus from its curriculum for 8th grade English classes, overriding a State curriculum decision, Clemmons was critical of the decision. Clemmons said "Books are being stripped out of public libraries that give detailed personal accounts from survivors and about victims of the Holocaust."

References

External links
Legislative website
Sam Zern (February 3, 2019). "Q&A with John Clemmons, the state representative challenging David Briley for Nashville mayor," Vanderbilt Hustler
Tommy Crouse (July 31, 2019). "Meet the mayoral candidates: Rep. John Ray Clemmons; Clemmons promises transit referendum," News Channel 5, Nashville.

Living people
Columbia Lions rowers
People from Lebanon, Tennessee
Politicians from Nashville, Tennessee
Democratic Party members of the Tennessee House of Representatives
21st-century American politicians
1977 births
Columbia College (New York) alumni
University of Memphis alumni